Khmer is an Austroasiatic language spoken by the Khmer people, and the official and national language of Cambodia. Khmer has been influenced considerably by Sanskrit and Pali, especially in the royal and religious registers, through Hinduism and Buddhism. It is also the earliest recorded and earliest written language of the Mon–Khmer family, predating Mon and Vietnamese, due to Old Khmer being the language of the historical empires of Chenla, Angkor and, presumably, their earlier predecessor state, Funan.

The vast majority of Khmer speakers speak Central Khmer, the dialect of the central plain where the Khmer are most heavily concentrated. Within Cambodia, regional accents exist in remote areas but these are regarded as varieties of Central Khmer. Two exceptions are the speech of the capital, Phnom Penh, and that of the Khmer Khe in Stung Treng province, both of which differ sufficiently enough from Central Khmer to be considered separate dialects of Khmer. 

Outside of Cambodia, three distinct dialects are spoken by ethnic Khmers native to areas that were historically part of the Khmer Empire. The Northern Khmer dialect is spoken by over a million Khmers in the southern regions of Northeast Thailand and is treated by some linguists as a separate language. Khmer Krom, or Southern Khmer, is the first language of the Khmer of Vietnam, while the Khmer living in the remote Cardamom Mountains speak a very conservative dialect that still displays features of the Middle Khmer language.

Khmer is primarily an analytic, isolating language. There are no inflections, conjugations or case endings. Instead, particles and auxiliary words are used to indicate grammatical relationships. General word order is subject–verb–object, and modifiers follow the word they modify. Classifiers appear after numbers when used to count nouns, though not always so consistently as in languages like Chinese. In spoken Khmer, topic-comment structure is common, and the perceived social relation between participants determines which sets of vocabulary, such as pronouns and honorifics, are proper.

Khmer differs from neighboring languages such as Burmese, Thai, Lao, and Vietnamese in that it is not a tonal language. Words are stressed on the final syllable, hence many words conform to the typical Mon–Khmer pattern of a stressed syllable preceded by a minor syllable. The language has been written in the Khmer script, an abugida descended from the Brahmi script via the southern Indian Pallava script, since at least the 7th century. The script's form and use has evolved over the centuries; its modern features include subscripted versions of consonants used to write clusters and a division of consonants into two series with different inherent vowels.

Classification

Khmer is a member of the Austroasiatic language family, the autochthonous family in an area that stretches from the Malay Peninsula through Southeast Asia to East India. Austroasiatic, which also includes Mon, Vietnamese and Munda, has been studied since 1856 and was first proposed as a language family in 1907. Despite the amount of research, there is still doubt about the internal relationship of the languages of Austroasiatic. 

Diffloth places Khmer in an eastern branch of the Mon-Khmer languages. In these classification schemes Khmer's closest genetic relatives are the Bahnaric and Pearic languages. More recent classifications doubt the validity of the Mon-Khmer sub-grouping and place the Khmer language as its own branch of Austroasiatic equidistant from the other 12 branches of the family.

Geographic distribution and dialects

Khmer is spoken by some 13 million people in Cambodia, where it is the official language. It is also a second language for most of the minority groups and indigenous hill tribes there. Additionally there are a million speakers of Khmer native to southern Vietnam (1999 census) and 1.4 million in northeast Thailand (2006).

Khmer dialects, although mutually intelligible, are sometimes quite marked. Notable variations are found in speakers from Phnom Penh (Cambodia's capital city), the rural Battambang area, the areas of Northeast Thailand adjacent to Cambodia such as Surin province, the Cardamom Mountains, and southern Vietnam. The dialects form a continuum running roughly north to south. Standard Cambodian Khmer is mutually intelligible with the others but a Khmer Krom speaker from Vietnam, for instance, may have great difficulty communicating with a Khmer native of Sisaket Province in Thailand.

The following is a classification scheme showing the development of the modern Khmer dialects.
 Middle Khmer
 Cardamom (Western) Khmer
 Central Khmer
 Surin (Northern) Khmer
 Standard Khmer and related dialects (including Khmer Krom)

Standard Khmer, or Central Khmer, the language as taught in Cambodian schools and used by the media, is based on the dialect spoken throughout the Central Plain, a region encompassed by the northwest and central provinces.

Northern Khmer (called  in Khmer) refers to the dialects spoken by many in several border provinces of present-day northeast Thailand. After the fall of the Khmer Empire in the early 15th century, the Dongrek Mountains served as a natural border leaving the Khmer north of the mountains under the sphere of influence of the Kingdom of Lan Xang. The conquests of Cambodia by Naresuan the Great for Ayutthaya furthered their political and economic isolation from Cambodia proper, leading to a dialect that developed relatively independently from the midpoint of the Middle Khmer period. 

This has resulted in a distinct accent influenced by the surrounding tonal languages Lao and Thai, lexical differences, and phonemic differences in both vowels and distribution of consonants. Syllable-final , which has become silent in other dialects of Khmer, is still pronounced in Northern Khmer. Some linguists classify Northern Khmer as a separate but closely related language rather than a dialect.

Western Khmer, also called Cardamom Khmer or Chanthaburi Khmer, is spoken by a very small, isolated population in the Cardamom mountain range extending from western Cambodia into eastern Central Thailand. Although little studied, this variety is unique in that it maintains a definite system of vocal register that has all but disappeared in other dialects of modern Khmer.

Phnom Penh Khmer is spoken in the capital and surrounding areas. This dialect is characterized by merging or complete elision of syllables, which speakers from other regions consider a "relaxed" pronunciation. For instance, "Phnom Penh" is sometimes shortened to "m'Penh". Another characteristic of Phnom Penh speech is observed in words with an "r" either as an initial consonant or as the second member of a consonant cluster (as in the English word "bread"). The "r", trilled or flapped in other dialects, is either pronounced as a uvular trill or not pronounced at all.

This alters the quality of any preceding consonant, causing a harder, more emphasized pronunciation. Another unique result is that the syllable is spoken with a low-rising or "dipping" tone much like the "hỏi" tone in Vietnamese. Another example is the word   ('study'), which is pronounced , with the uvular "r" and the same intonation described above.

Khmer Krom or Southern Khmer is spoken by the indigenous Khmer population of the Mekong Delta, formerly controlled by the Khmer Empire but part of Vietnam since 1698. Khmers are persecuted by the Vietnamese government for using their native language and, since the 1950s, have been forced to take Vietnamese names. Consequently, very little research has been published regarding this dialect. It has been generally influenced by Vietnamese for three centuries and accordingly displays a pronounced accent, tendency toward monosyllabic words and lexical differences from Standard Khmer.

Khmer Khe is spoken in the Se San, Srepok and Sekong river valleys of Sesan and Siem Pang districts in Stung Treng Province. Following the decline of Angkor, the Khmer abandoned their northern territories, which the Lao then settled. In the 17th century, Chey Chetha XI led a Khmer force into Stung Treng to retake the area. The Khmer Khe living in this area of Stung Treng in modern times are presumed to be the descendants of this group. Their dialect is thought to resemble that of pre-modern Siem Reap.

Historical periods

Linguistic study of the Khmer language divides its history into four periods one of which, the Old Khmer period, is subdivided into pre-Angkorian and Angkorian. Pre-Angkorian Khmer is the Old Khmer language from 600 CE through 800. Angkorian Khmer is the language as it was spoken in the Khmer Empire from the 9th century until the 13th century.

The following centuries saw changes in morphology, phonology and lexicon. The language of this transition period, from about the 14th to 18th centuries, is referred to as Middle Khmer and saw borrowings from Thai in the literary register. Modern Khmer is dated from the 19th century to today.

The following table shows the conventionally accepted historical stages of Khmer.

Just as modern Khmer was emerging from the transitional period represented by Middle Khmer, Cambodia fell under the influence of French colonialism.  Thailand, which had for centuries claimed suzerainty over Cambodia and controlled succession to the Cambodian throne, began losing its influence on the language. In 1887 Cambodia was fully integrated into French Indochina, which brought in a French-speaking aristocracy. This led to French becoming the language of higher education and the intellectual class. By 1907, the French had wrested over half of modern-day Cambodia, including the north and northwest where Thai had been the prestige language, back from Thai control and reintegrated it into the country.

Many native scholars in the early 20th century, led by a monk named Chuon Nath, resisted the French and Thai influences on their language. Forming the government sponsored Cultural Committee to define and standardize the modern language, they championed Khmerization, purging of foreign elements, reviving affixation, and the use of Old Khmer roots and historical Pali and Sanskrit to coin new words for modern ideas. Opponents, led by Keng Vannsak, who embraced "total Khmerization" by denouncing the reversion to classical languages and favoring the use of contemporary colloquial Khmer for neologisms, and Ieu Koeus, who favored borrowing from Thai, were also influential. 

Koeus later joined the Cultural Committee and supported Nath. Nath's views and prolific work won out and he is credited with cultivating modern Khmer-language identity and culture, overseeing the translation of the entire Pali Buddhist canon into Khmer. He also created the modern Khmer language dictionary that is still in use today, helping preserve Khmer during the French colonial period.

Phonology

The phonological system described here is the inventory of sounds of the standard spoken language, represented using the International Phonetic Alphabet (IPA).

Consonants

However, the aspirated sounds in that position may be analyzed as sequences of two phonemes: . This analysis is supported by the fact that infixes can be inserted between the stop and the aspiration; for example  ('big') becomes  ('size') with a nominalizing infix.

The voiced plosives are pronounced as implosives  by most speakers, but this feature is weak in educated speech, where they become .

In syllable-final position,  and  approach  and  respectively.  The stops  are unaspirated and have no audible release when occurring as syllable finals.

Vowels
Various authors have proposed slightly different analyses of the Khmer vowel system. This may be in part because of the wide degree of variation in pronunciation between individual speakers, even within a dialectal region. The description below follows Huffman (1970). The number of vowel nuclei and their values vary between dialects; differences exist even between the Standard Khmer system and that of the Battambang dialect on which the standard is based.

In addition, some diphthongs and triphthongs are analyzed as a vowel nucleus plus a semivowel ( or ) coda because they cannot be followed by a final consonant.

Syllable structure
A Khmer syllable begins with a single consonant, or else with a cluster of two, or rarely three, consonants. There are 85 possible two-consonant clusters (including [pʰ] etc. analyzed as /ph/ etc.). All the clusters are shown in the following table, phonetically, i.e. superscript ʰ can mark either contrastive or non-contrastive aspiration (see above).

After the initial consonant or consonant cluster comes the syllabic nucleus, which is one of the vowels listed above. This vowel may end the syllable or may be followed by a coda, which is a single consonant. If the syllable is stressed and the vowel is short, there must be a final consonant. All consonant sounds except  and the aspirates can appear as the coda (although final /r/ is heard in some dialects, most notably in Northern Khmer).

A minor syllable (unstressed syllable preceding the main syllable of a word) has a structure of CV-, CrV-, CVN- or CrVN- (where C is a consonant, V a vowel, and N a nasal consonant). An example of such a word is  mɔnuh, mɔnɨh, mĕəʾnuh ('person'), pronounced , or more casually .

Stress
Stress in Khmer falls on the final syllable of a word. Because of this predictable pattern, stress is non-phonemic in Khmer (it does not distinguish different meanings).

Most Khmer words consist of either one or two syllables. In most native disyllabic words, the first syllable is a minor (fully unstressed) syllable. Such words have been described as sesquisyllabic (i.e. as having one-and-a-half syllables). There are also some disyllabic words in which the first syllable does not behave as a minor syllable, but takes secondary stress. Most such words are compounds, but some are single morphemes (generally loanwords).

Words with three or more syllables, if they are not compounds, are mostly loanwords, usually derived from Pali, Sanskrit, or more recently, French. They are nonetheless adapted to Khmer stress patterns. Primary stress falls on the final syllable, with secondary stress on every second syllable from the end. Thus in a three-syllable word, the first syllable has secondary stress; in a four-syllable word, the second syllable has secondary stress; in a five-syllable word, the first and third syllables have secondary stress, and so on. Long polysyllables are not often used in conversation.

Compounds, however, preserve the stress patterns of the constituent words.

Phonation and tone

Khmer once had a phonation distinction in its vowels, but this now survives only in the most archaic dialect (Western Khmer). The distinction arose historically when vowels after Old Khmer voiced consonants became breathy voiced and diphthongized; for example  became . When consonant voicing was lost, the distinction was maintained by the vowel; later the phonation disappeared as well. These processes explain the origin of what are now called a-series and o-series consonants in the Khmer script.

Intonation
Intonation often conveys semantic context in Khmer, as in distinguishing declarative statements, questions and exclamations. The available grammatical means of making such distinctions are not always used, or may be ambiguous; for example, the final interrogative particle   can also serve as an emphasizing (or in some cases negating) particle.

The intonation pattern of a typical Khmer declarative phrase is a steady rise throughout followed by an abrupt drop on the last syllable.
       ('I don't want it')

Other intonation contours signify a different type of phrase such as the "full doubt" interrogative, similar to yes-no questions in English. Full doubt interrogatives remain fairly even in tone throughout, but rise sharply towards the end.
       ('do you want to go to Siem Reap?')

Exclamatory phrases follow the typical steadily rising pattern, but rise sharply on the last syllable instead of falling.
       ('this book is expensive!')

Grammar

Khmer is primarily an analytic language with no inflection. Syntactic relations are mainly determined by word order. Old and Middle Khmer used particles to mark grammatical categories and many of these have survived in Modern Khmer but are used sparingly, mostly in literary or formal language. Khmer makes extensive use of auxiliary verbs, "directionals" and serial verb construction. Colloquial Khmer is a zero copula language, instead preferring predicative adjectives (and even predicative nouns) unless using a copula for emphasis or to avoid ambiguity in more complex sentences. Basic word order is subject–verb–object (SVO), although subjects are often dropped; prepositions are used rather than postpositions. 

Topic-Comment constructions are common and the language is generally head-initial (modifiers follow the words they modify). Some grammatical processes are still not fully understood by western scholars. For example, it is not clear if certain features of Khmer grammar, such as actor nominalization, should be treated as a morphological process or a purely syntactic device, and some derivational morphology seems "purely decorative" and performs no known syntactic work.

Lexical categories have been hard to define in Khmer. Henri Maspero, an early scholar of Khmer, claimed the language had no parts of speech, while a later scholar, Judith Jacob, posited four parts of speech and innumerable particles. John Haiman, on the other hand, identifies "a couple dozen" parts of speech in Khmer with the caveat that Khmer words have the freedom to perform a variety of syntactic functions depending on such factors as word order, relevant particles, location within a clause, intonation and context. Some of the more important lexical categories and their function are demonstrated in the following example sentence taken from a hospital brochure:

Morphology
Modern Khmer is an isolating language, which means that it uses little productive morphology. There is some derivation by means of prefixes and infixes, but this is a remnant of Old Khmer and not always productive in the modern language. Khmer morphology is evidence of a historical process through which  the language was, at some point in the past, changed from being an agglutinative language to adopting an isolating typology. Affixed forms are lexicalized and cannot be used productively to form new words. Below are some of the most common affixes with examples as given by Huffman.

Compounding in Khmer is a common derivational process that takes two forms, coordinate compounds and repetitive compounds. Coordinate compounds join two unbound morphemes (independent words) of similar meaning to form a compound signifying a concept more general than either word alone. Coordinate compounds join either two nouns or two verbs. Repetitive compounds, one of the most productive derivational features of Khmer, use reduplication of an entire word to derive words whose meaning depends on the class of the reduplicated word. A repetitive compound of a noun indicates plurality or generality while that of an adjectival verb could mean either an intensification or plurality.

Coordinate compounds:
{| style="width:25%;"
|  || + ||  || ⇒ || 
|-
| "father" || || "mother" || ⇒ || "parents"
|}
{| style="width:25%;"
|  || + ||  || ⇒ || 
|-
| "to transport" || || "to bring" || ⇒ || "to lead"
|}

Repetitive compounds:
{| style="width:40%;"
|  || ⇒ ||  ||  ||  || ⇒ || 
|-
| "fast" || || "very fast, quickly" ||  || "women" || || "women, women in general"
|}

Nouns and pronouns
Khmer nouns do not inflect for grammatical gender or singular/plural. Plurality can be marked by postnominal particles, numerals, or reduplication of a following adjective, which, although similar to intensification, is usually not ambiguous due to context.

{|
| 
|style="width:20%; text-align: center"| or
| 
|style="width:20%; text-align: center"| or
| 
|}

Classifying particles are used after numerals, but are not always obligatory as they are in Thai or Chinese, for example, and are often dropped in colloquial speech. Khmer nouns are divided into two groups: mass nouns, which take classifiers; and specific, nouns, which do not. The overwhelming majority are mass nouns.

Possession is colloquially expressed by word order. The possessor is placed after the thing that is possessed. Alternatively, in more complex sentences or when emphasis is required, a possessive construction using the word  ("property, object") may be employed. In formal and literary contexts, the possessive particle  is used:

{|
| 
| style="width:20%; text-align: center" | or
| 
| style="width:20%; text-align: center" | or
| 
|}

Pronouns are subject to a complicated system of social register, the choice of pronoun depending on the perceived relationships between speaker, audience and referent (see Social registers below). Khmer exhibits pronoun avoidance, so kinship terms, nicknames and proper names are often used instead of pronouns (including for the first person) among intimates. Subject pronouns are frequently dropped in colloquial conversation.

Adjectives, verbs and verb phrases may be made into nouns by the use of nominalization particles. These particles are prefixed most often to verbs to form abstract nouns.

{|
| 
| style="width:20%; text-align: center" |
| 
| style="width:20%; text-align: center" |
| 
|}

Adjectives and adverbs
Adjectives, demonstratives and numerals follow the noun they modify. Adverbs likewise follow the verb. Morphologically, adjectives and adverbs are not distinguished, with many words often serving either function. Adjectives are also employed as verbs as Khmer sentences rarely use a copula.

Degrees of comparison are constructed syntactically. Comparatives are expressed using the word  : "A X  [B]" (A is more X [than B]).  The most common way to express superlatives is with  : "A X " (A is the most X). Intensity is also expressed syntactically, similar to other languages of the region, by reduplication or with the use of intensifiers.

{|
| 
| style="width:15%; text-align: center" |
| 
| style="width:15%; text-align: center" |
| 
|}

Verbs
Serial verb construction is quite common.

Khmer verbs are a relatively open class and can be divided into two types, main verbs and auxiliary verbs. Huffman defined a Khmer verb as "any word that can be (negated)", and further divided main verbs into three classes.

Transitive verbs are verbs that may be followed by a direct object:

{|
| 
| style="width:20%; text-align: center" |
| 
|}

Intransitive verbs are verbs that can not be followed by an object:

{|
| 
| style="width:20%; text-align: center" |
| 
|}

Adjectival verbs are a word class that has no equivalent in English. When modifying a noun or verb, they function as adjectives or adverbs, respectively, but they may also be used as main verbs equivalent to English "be + adjective".

{|
! 
| style="width:20%; text-align: center" |
! 
| style="width:20%; text-align: center" |
! 
|-
| 
|
| 
|
| 
|}

Syntax
Syntax is the rules and processes that describe how sentences are formed in a particular language, how words relate to each other within clauses or phrases and how those phrases relate to each other within a sentence to convey meaning. Khmer syntax is very analytic. Relationships between words and phrases are signified primarily by word order supplemented with auxiliary verbs and, particularly in formal and literary registers, grammatical marking particles. Grammatical phenomena such as negation and aspect are marked by particles while interrogative sentences are marked either by particles or interrogative words equivalent to English "wh-words".

A complete Khmer sentence consists of four basic elements—an optional topic, an optional subject, an obligatory predicate, and various adverbials and particles. The topic and subject are noun phrases, predicates are verb phrases and another noun phrase acting as an object or verbal attribute often follows the predicate.

Basic constituent order
When combining these noun and verb phrases into a sentence the order is typically SVO:

{| style="width:25%;"
|  ||  ||  ||  || 
|-
|  || ||  ||
|-
| I || give || banana || one || bunch[]
|-
| colspan=5 | 'I gave a bunch of bananas.'
|}

When both a direct object and indirect object are present without any grammatical markers, the preferred order is SV(DO)(IO). In such a case, if the direct object phrase contains multiple components, the indirect object immediately follows the noun of the direct object phrase and the direct object's modifiers follow the indirect object:

{| style="width:25%;"
|  ||  ||  ||  ||  || 
|-
|  || || ||  ||
|-
| I || give || banana || pig || one || bunch[]
|-
| colspan=6 | 'I gave the pig a bunch of bananas.'
|}

This ordering of objects can be changed and the meaning clarified with the inclusion of particles. The word , which normally means "to arrive" or "towards", can be used as a preposition meaning "to":
{| style="width:25%;"
|  ||  ||  ||  ||  ||  || 
|-
| I ||  give ||  banana ||  one || bunch[] || toward || pig
|-
| colspan=7 | 'I gave a bunch of bananas to the pigs.'
|}

Alternatively, the indirect object could precede the direct object if the object-marking preposition  were used:
{| style="width:25%;"
|  ||  ||  ||  ||  ||  || 
|-
| I ||  give ||  pig ||  || banana || one || bunch[]
|-
| colspan=7 | 'I gave the pig a bunch of bananas.'
|}

However, in spoken discourse OSV is possible when emphasizing the object in a topic–comment-like structure.
{| style="width:25%;"
|  ||  ||  ||  || 
|-
| boat || one || to sit || five || monk[]
|-
| colspan=5 | 'In a boat sit five monks.'
|}
{| style="width:25%;"
|  ||  ||  ||  || 
|-
| science || thief || to steal ||  || 
|-
| colspan=5 | 'Science, a thief can not steal.'
|}

Noun phrase
The noun phrase in Khmer typically has the following structure:
 = 
The elements in parentheses are optional. Honorifics are a class of words that serve to index the social status of the referent. The word  ('those over there') has a more distal or vague connotation. 

If the noun phrase contains a possessive adjective, it follows the noun and precedes the numeral. If a descriptive attribute co-occurs with a possessive, the possessive construction is expected.

Some examples of typical Khmer noun phrases are:
{| class="wikitable"
|-
! Khmer text !! IPA !! gloss !! translation
|-
|  ||  || house high three four spine[] these      || 'these three or four high houses'
|-
|  ||  || banana ripe two bunches[] these     || these two bunches of ripe bananas
|-
|  ||  || friend I two person[] these     || these two friends of mine
|-
|  ||  || friend small of I two person[] these      || these two small friends of mine
|}

The Khmer particle  marked attributes in Old Khmer noun phrases and is used in formal and literary language to signify that what precedes is the noun and what follows is the attribute. Modern usage may carry the connotation of mild intensity.

{| style="width:25%;"
|  ||  ||  || 
|-
| field || paddy ||  || vast
|-
| colspan=4 | '(very) expansive fields and paddies'
|}

Verb phrase
Khmer verbs are completely uninflected, and once a subject or topic has been introduced or is clear from context the noun phrase may be dropped. Thus, the simplest possible sentence in Khmer consists of a single verb. For example,  'to go' on its own can mean "I'm going.", "He went.", "They've gone.", "Let's go.", etc. This also results in long strings of verbs such as:
{| style="width:25%;"
|  ||  ||  ||  || 
|-
| I || to want || to go || to walk || to play
|-
| colspan=5 | 'I want to go for a stroll.'
|}

Khmer uses three verbs for what translates into English as the copula. The verb  is the "existential" copula meaning "there is" or "there exists".
{| style="width:35%;"
|  ||  ||  ||  ||  ||  ||  || 
|-
| language ||  ||  || to express || heart || thought || all || kind
|-
| colspan=8 | 'Language is the expression of all emotions and ideas'
|}
{| style="text-align: left;"
|  ||  ||  ||  || style="width:30%; text-align: center" |   ||  || 
|-
| he ||  || close || temple || style="width:30%; text-align: center" |    || to exist || plan
|-
| colspan=4 | 'He is close to the temple.' || style="width:30%; text-align: center" |    || colspan=2 | 'There is a plan.'
|}

Negation is achieved by putting   before the verb and the particle   at the end of the sentence or clause. In colloquial speech, verbs can also be negated without the need for a final particle, by placing   before them.
{| style="text-align: left;"
|  ||  || style="width:15%; text-align: center" |   ||  ||  ||  ||  || style="width:15%; text-align: center" |   ||  ||  || 
|-
| I || to believe || style="width:15%; text-align: center" |   || I ||  || to believe ||  || style="width:15%; text-align: center" |   || I ||  || to believe
|-
| colspan=2 | 'I believe.' || style="width:15%; text-align: center" |    || colspan=4 | 'I don't believe.' || style="width:15%; text-align: center" |    || colspan=3 | 'I don't believe.'
|}

Past tense can be conveyed by adverbs, such as "yesterday" or by the use of perfective particles such as 
{| style="text-align: left;"
|  ||  ||  || style="width:30%; text-align: center" |   ||  ||  || 
|-
| he || to go || yesterday || style="width:30%; text-align: center" |    || he || to go || 
|-
| colspan=3 | 'He went yesterday.' || style="width:30%; text-align: center" |    || colspan=3 | 'He left.' or 'He's already gone.'
|}

Different senses of future action can also be expressed by the use of adverbs like "tomorrow" or by the future tense marker , which is placed immediately before the verb, or both:
{| style="width:35%;"
|  ||  ||  ||  || 
|-
| tomorrow || I ||  || to go || school
|-
| colspan=5 | 'Tomorrow, I will go to school.'
|}

Imperatives are often unmarked. For example, in addition to the meanings given above, the "sentence"  can also mean "Go!". Various words and particles may be added to the verb to soften the command to varying degrees, including to the point of politeness (jussives):
{| style="text-align: left;"
|  ||  ||  ||  ||  ||  || style="width:30%; text-align: center" |   ||  ||  ||  ||  ||  || 
|-
|  || try || try || you ||  ||  || style="width:30%; text-align: center" |    || please || do || follow || instruction || he || 
|-
| colspan=6 | 'Go ahead and try it yourself.' || style="width:30%; text-align: center" |    || colspan=6 | 'Please follow his instructions.'
|}

Prohibitives take the form " + " and also are often softened by the addition of the particle  to the end of the phrase.
{| style="width:35%;"
|  ||  ||  ||  || 
|-
|  || to be || place ||  || 
|-
| colspan=5 | 'Don't stay in this place.'
|}

Questions
There are three basic types of questions in Khmer. Questions requesting specific information use question words. Polar questions are indicated with interrogative particles, most commonly , a homonym of the negation particle. Tag questions are indicated with various particles and rising inflection. The SVO word order is generally not inverted for questions.

{| style="text-align: left;"
|  ||  ||  || style="width:10%; text-align: center" |   ||  ||  ||  ||  || style="width:10%; text-align: center" |   ||  ||  ||  ||  ||  || 
|-
| you || to go || where || style="width:10%; text-align: center" |    || you || understand ||  ||  || style="width:10%; text-align: center" |    || you || to go || market ||  || or || yet
|-
| colspan=3 | 'Where are you going?' || style="width:10%; text-align: center" |    || colspan=4 | 'Can you understand?' || style="width:10%; text-align: center" |    || colspan=7 | 'Have you gone to the store yet?'
|}

In more formal contexts and in polite speech, questions are also marked at their beginning by the particle .

{| style="width:25%;"
|  ||  ||  ||  || 
|-
|  || you || to invite || to go || where
|-
| colspan=5 | 'Where are you going, sir?'
|}

Passive voice
Khmer does not have a passive voice, but there is a construction utilizing the main verb  ("to hit", "to be correct", "to affect") as an auxiliary verb meaning "to be subject to" or "to undergo"—which results in sentences that are translated to English using the passive voice.
{| style="width:25%;"
|  ||  ||  ||  ||  || 
|-
| from || yesterday || I || to undergo || dog || to bite
|-
| colspan=6 | 'Yesterday I was bitten by a dog.'
|}

Clause syntax
Complex sentences are formed in Khmer by the addition of one or more clauses to the main clause. The various types of clauses in Khmer include the coordinate clause, the relative clause and the subordinate clause. Word order in clauses is the same for that of the basic sentences described above. Coordinate clauses do not necessarily have to be marked; they can simply follow one another.

For example, both phrases below can mean "the hospital bed that has wheels".
{| style="text-align: left;"
|  ||  ||  ||  ||  || style="width:20%; text-align: center" |   ||  ||  ||  ||  ||  || 
|-
| bed || hospital || have || wheel || to push || style="width:20%; text-align: center" |    || bed || hospital ||  || have || wheel || to push
|}

Relative clauses are more likely to be introduced with  if they do not immediately follow the head noun. Khmer subordinate conjunctions always precede a subordinate clause.

Numerals

Counting in Khmer is based on a biquinary system: the numbers from 6 to 9 have the form "five one", "five two", etc. The words for multiples of ten from 30 to 90 are not related to the basic Khmer numbers, but are Chinese in origin, and probably came to Khmer via Thai. Khmer numerals, which were inherited from Indian numerals, are used more widely than Western Arabic numerals.

The principal number words are listed in the following table, which gives Western and Khmer digits, Khmer spelling and IPA transcription.

Intermediate numbers are formed by compounding the above elements.

Ordinal numbers are formed by placing the particle    before the corresponding cardinal number.

Social registers
Khmer employs a system of registers in which the speaker must always be conscious of the social status of the person spoken to. The different registers, which include those used for common speech, polite speech, speaking to or about royals and speaking to or about monks, employ alternate verbs, names of body parts and pronouns. Another result is that the pronominal system is complex and full of honorific variations, just a few of which are shown in the table below.

Writing system

Khmer is written with the Khmer script, an abugida developed from the Pallava script of India before the 7th century when the first known inscription appeared. Written left-to-right with vowel signs that can be placed after, before, above or below the consonant they follow, the Khmer script is similar in appearance and usage to Thai and Lao, both of which were based on the Khmer system. The Khmer script is also distantly related to the Mon–Burmese script. Within Cambodia, literacy in the Khmer alphabet is estimated at 77.6%.

Consonant symbols in Khmer are divided into two groups, or series. The first series carries the inherent vowel  while the second series carries the inherent vowel . As the voicing of stops was lost, however, the contrast shifted to the phonation of the attached vowels, which, in turn, evolved into a simple difference of vowel quality, often by diphthongization. This process has resulted in the Khmer alphabet having two symbols for most consonant phonemes and each vowel symbol having two possible readings, depending on the series of the initial consonant:

Examples

The following text is from Article 1 of the Universal Declaration of Human Rights.

See also

 Hem Chieu
 Khmer literature
 Romanization of Khmer

References and notes

Further reading

 Ferlus, Michel. (1992). Essai de phonétique historique du khmer (Du milieu du premier millénaire de notre ère à l'époque actuelle)", Mon–Khmer Studies XXI: 57–89)
 Headley, Robert and others. (1977). Cambodian-English Dictionary. Washington, Catholic University Press. 
 Herington, Jennifer and Amy Ryan. (2013). Sociolinguistic Survey of the Khmer Khe in Cambodia . Chiang Mai: Linguistics Institute, Payap University.
 Huffman, F. E., Promchan, C., & Lambert, C.-R. T. (1970). Modern spoken Cambodian. New Haven: Yale University Press. 
 Huffman, F. E., Lambert, C.-R. T., & Im Proum. (1970). Cambodian system of writing and beginning reader with drills and glossary. Yale linguistic series. New Haven: Yale University Press. 
 Jacob, Judith. (1966). ‘Some features of Khmer versification’, in C. E. Bazell, J. C. Catford, M. A. K. Halliday, and R. H. Robins, eds., In Memory of J. R Firth, 227–41. London: Longman. [Includes discussion of the two series of syllables and their places in Khmer shymes]
 Jacob, Judith. (1974). A Concise Cambodian-English Dictionary. London, Oxford University Press. 
 Jacob, J. M. (1996). The traditional literature of Cambodia: a preliminary guide. London oriental series, v. 40. New York: Oxford University Press. 
 Jacob, J. M., & Smyth, D. (1993). Cambodian linguistics, literature and history: collected articles. London: School of Oriental and African Studies, University of London. 
 Keesee, A. P. K. (1996). An English-spoken Khmer dictionary: with romanized writing system, usage, and indioms, and notes on Khmer speech and grammar. London: Kegan Paul International. 
 Meechan, M. (1992). Register in Khmer the laryngeal specification of pharyngeal expansion. Ottawa: National Library of Canada = Bibliothèque nationale du Canada. 
 Sak-Humphry, C. (2002). Communicating in Khmer: an interactive intermediate level Khmer course. Manoa, Hawai'i: Center for Southeast Asian Studies, School of Hawaiian, Asian and Pacific Studies, University of Hawai'i at Manoa. OCLC: 56840636
 Smyth, D. (1995). Colloquial Cambodian: a complete language course. London: Routledge. 
 Stewart, F., & May, S. (2004). In the shadow of Angkor: contemporary writing from Cambodia. Honolulu: University of Hawai'i Press. 
 Tonkin, D. (1991). The Cambodian alphabet: how to write the Khmer language. Bangkok: Trasvin Publications. 

External links

 Kheng.info—An online audio dictionary for learning Khmer, with thousands of native speaker recordings and text segmentation software.
 SEAlang Project: Mon–Khmer languages. The Khmeric Branch
 Khmer Swadesh vocabulary list (from Wiktionary's Swadesh-list appendix)
 Dictionary and SpellChecker open sourced and collaborative project based on Chuon Nath Khmer Dictionary
 How to install Khmer script on a Windows 7 computer
 How to install Khmer script on a Windows XP computer
 Khmer'' at UCLA Language Materials project
 Online Khmer & English dictionary
 Khmer Online Dictionaries
 Khmer audio lessons at Wikiotics
 http://unicode-table.com/en/sections/khmer/
 http://unicode-table.com/en/sections/khmer-symbols/

 
Languages attested from the 9th century
Analytic languages
Isolating languages
Languages of Cambodia
Languages of Thailand
Languages of Vietnam
Subject–verb–object languages